Hay Street is a major road through the central business district of Perth, Western Australia and adjacent suburbs. The street was named after Robert William Hay, the Permanent Under Secretary for Colonies. Sections of the road were called Howick Street and Twiss Street until 1897. One block in the central business section is now a pedestrian mall with extremely limited vehicular traffic, so that it is necessary to make a significant detour in order to drive the entire length of Hay Street.

Route description
Orientated east-west, the road starts at The Causeway travelling west through the suburbs of East Perth, Perth, West Perth, and Subiaco, where the road originally terminated at Subiaco. Unusually, the street numbers reset to 1 when Hay Street crosses Thomas Street and enters Subiaco.

A subway under the Fremantle railway line was constructed in the early 1900s, replaced when the railway was moved underground through Subiaco in 1999. From that point it becomes Underwood Avenue through Jolimont, Floreat (past Perry Lakes) and ends in Swanbourne.

Buildings
A number of buildings are along the road, including:
 Gledden Building
 His Majesty's Theatre
 London Court
 Melbourne Hotel
 Perth Town Hall
City of Perth Library
Carillon City
 Piccadilly Theatre and Arcade
Plaza Theatre and Arcade
 QV.1
 Regal Theatre
 Ross Memorial Church
 St Georges Hall
 Subiaco Hotel
 Walsh's Building

History

Pedestrian mall
The Hay Street pedestrian mall was the earliest conversion from street to mall in Perth, introduced in 1972, despite the road being a major thoroughfare. Through traffic was initially diverted to either Murray Street or St Georges Terrace.

Cathedral Square
Hay Street between Pier Street and Barrack Street defines the northern boundary of a block, that has evolved in name from the Cathedral precinct to Cathedral Square, in which the Perth Town Hall, and the City of Perth Library are situated on the Hay Street side of the square.

Major intersections

In popular culture
A photograph of the Hay Street pedestrian mall taken in the early 1980s was used as the cover art for Perth-based psychedelic rock band Pond's 2017 album The Weather.

See also

 List of lanes and arcades in Perth, Western Australia

Notes

References

External links

 
 Photographs of Hay Street at  State Library of Western Australia, Picture Australia, and Flickr.

 
Streets in Perth central business district, Western Australia
Streets in West Perth, Western Australia
Subiaco, Western Australia
Pedestrian malls in Australia